Thelocactus nidulans is a cactus in the genus Thelocactus of the family Cactaceae.

Description
Thelocactus nidulans  is globe-shaped solitary cactus about 15 cm high and about 20 cm in diameter. The ribs are rather low and marked with raised, angulartubercles. There can be from 20 to 25 ribs. The central spines are usually black-brown, mostly coarser, number up to six and stand vertically out from the plant, while radial/radiating spines are often needle-like, spread out and can be from 1.3 – 1.5 cm long. Flowers grow from the new areoles at the very top of the plant. They are funnel-shaped about 4 cm long, have a diameter of 2.5 – 7.5 cm and their colours is yellow or whitish. They are diurnal.

Distribution
This species is native to Mexico (Coahuila de Zaragoza, Nuevo León).

References
 Nathaniel Lord Britton, Joseph Nelson Rose  The Cactaceae: Descriptions and Illustrations of Plants of the Cactus family, Volume 3
 Zipcodezoo
 Biologie.uni
 Tropicos.org
 T. nidulans photo

Cactoideae